OBF may refer to:
OBF (band), 2012 rename of The Original Bucks Fizz
Open Bioinformatics Foundation, non-profit organization supporting open source programming in bioinformatics.
Oregon Bach Festival, an annual midsummer J. S. Bach festival in Eugene, Oregon
Oregon Brewers Festival, an annual craft beer festival
Out of Box Failure, computer hardware term
Ordovician Bellefonte Formation, a rock formation in central Pennsylvania
Oberpfaffenhofen Airport's IATA code
Orthonormal Basis Function as in Hilbert space